The Arga is a river of Navarre, in Spain, and is a tributary of the Aragón River, itself a tributary of the river Ebro. The Arga was known as the river Runa in antiquity. The source of the river is to the north of the village Esteríbar, near the border with France, and it empties into the Aragón River near Funes.

The river is dammed in the Eugui reservoir near Esteríbar; the dam principally serves the needs of Pamplona's metropolitan area, the largest city on the Arga.

Vegetation
At the upper basin, the river is mainly surrounded by beech trees and beneath these grow bilberries, Cornish heath, sedges and luzulas. Additionally, a variety of shrubs can be found in the proximity of the Eugui reservoir, including; alder, ash, maple, common hazel and buckthorn. After the dam, the lower river is lined with oak and Scots pine trees and boxwood shrubs.

At the point where the river passes Huarte/Uharte, crack willow appear. The shrubbery around the area of Belascoáin marks the change from Cantabrian forest to more Mediterranean plant life; black poplar and white willow are common in this region.

See also 
 List of rivers of Spain

Rivers of Spain
Ebro basin
Rivers of Navarre